Interstate 880 may refer to:

Interstate 880 (California), an auxiliary Interstate Highway that travels from San Jose to Oakland, California
Interstate 880 (California 1964–1981), a former auxiliary Interstate Highway in Sacramento, California
Interstate 880 (Iowa), an auxiliary Interstate Highway in Pottawattamie County, Iowa

8
80-8